Pagan-Fletcher House is a historic home located at Valley Stream in Nassau County, New York. It was built about 1840 and is a two-story, clapboard sided dwelling, five bays wide with a shallow central portico. It has a one-story rear wing with an exterior end chimney. It was extensively remodeled in the early 20th century to the Colonial Revival style, when the farmhouse was more than doubled in size.  It is the only surviving 19th century structure in Valley Stream.  The house was the site of the village's first post office.

It was listed on the National Register of Historic Places in 1983.

The house has been restored by the Valley Stream Historical Society to an early 20th-century appearance.  It is open to the public on Sunday afternoons.

References

External links
 Valley Stream Historical Society: Pagan-Fletcher Restoration

Houses on the National Register of Historic Places in New York (state)
Colonial Revival architecture in New York (state)
Houses completed in 1840
Houses in Nassau County, New York
Museums in Nassau County, New York
Historic house museums in New York (state)
National Register of Historic Places in Nassau County, New York
1840 establishments in New York (state)